is a Japanese figure skater. He is the 1999 World Junior bronze medalist and the 1999 & 2002 Japanese national champion. He represented Japan at the 2002 Winter Olympics, placing 22nd. He was coached by Takashi Mura and his programs were choreographed by Tatiana Tarasova and Nikolai Morozov.

Currently he is the director of athlete development in figure skating branch of Japan Skating Federation.

Programs

Results
GP: Grand Prix; JGP: Junior Grand Prix

References

External links
 

Japanese male single skaters
Olympic figure skaters of Japan
Figure skaters at the 2002 Winter Olympics
Living people
1979 births
World Junior Figure Skating Championships medalists
Sportspeople from Tokyo
Competitors at the 1999 Winter Universiade